Heinz Kessler or Heinz Keßler (26 January 1920 – 2 May 2017) was a German communist politician and military officer in East Germany. 

His career in the military started when he was conscripted into the Wehrmacht, the armed forces of Nazi Germany, in WWII. Due to his communist convictions, he deserted the Wehrmacht and fought for the Soviet Union on the Eastern Front. Upon his return to East Germany, he was given the rank of Armeegeneral in the National People's Army (Nationale Volksarmee). Later, he was Minister of Defense of the GDR, a member of the Politbüro of the Central Committee of the Socialist Unity Party of Germany (SED), and a deputy of the GDR's Volkskammer (parliament).

Convicted for his role in the deaths of defectors along the Berlin wall, he was sentenced to seven and a half years in prison after German reunification, and served his sentence in Hakenfelde Prison. He was released from prison in 1998 after serving only two years.

Biography

Early life

Kessler was born into a communist family in Lauban, Lower Silesia and was raised in Chemnitz. He joined the Red Young Pioneers, the youth organization of the Communist Party of Germany (KPD), at age 6 and the Young Spartacus League at 10. He later apprenticed as a motor mechanic.

Military career
Drafted into the Wehrmacht in 1940, he deserted and defected to the Soviet Red Army three weeks after the German invasion of the USSR and fought for the Soviet Union until the end of the war. Upon his desertion, he was sentenced to death in absentia by a Military tribunal and his mother was arrested and imprisoned in the Ravensbrück concentration camp. He wouldn't see her again until June 1945, shortly after the end of the war, in a reunion that he considered to be "one of the most eventful and beautiful days" of his life.

Upon returning to Germany in 1945, Kessler joined the KPD in the Soviet occupation zone, which merged with the Social Democratic Party (SPD) in the Soviet zone in 1946 to form the SED. Also in 1946, Kessler became a member of the SED Central Committee.

He was appointed Chief of the Air Forces and Air Defense (Luftstreitkräfte/Luftverteidigung) of the NVA in 1956, and as deputy minister of defense in 1957. He became Chief of the NVA Main Staff (Hauptstab – General Staff) in 1967, with the rank of Generaloberst (Colonel General). Simultaneously, he also became a member of the Military Council of the United High Command of the Warsaw Pact.

Kessler was promoted from Chief of the Main Political Administration (Chef der Politischen Hauptverwaltung) of the NVA to Defense Minister (with the rank of Armeegeneral) on 3 December 1985 after his predecessor, Armeegeneral Heinz Hoffmann, died of a heart attack.

Conviction and imprisonment
In 1991, after the Unification of Germany, Kessler was arrested after police received information that Kessler would attempt to flee the country disguised as a Soviet officer. German police blockaded the Sperenberg Airfield to prevent Kessler's escape, but later arrested him in Berlin after changing the lock on his home and informing him that he could retrieve his keys at a local police station.

He was tried in a German court for incitement to commit intentional homicide, for his role in the deaths of people who tried to flee the GDR between 1971 and 1989. On 16 September 1993, Kessler was found guilty of manslaughter and was sentenced to seven and a half years in prison.

Kessler filed an appeal to the European Court of Human Rights, claiming that his actions were in accordance with GDR law and meant to preserve the existence of the GDR. However, his appeal was denied largely on the basis that the GDR's policies violated international human rights.

Kessler served his sentence in Berlin-Hakenfelde prison from November 1996 to October 1998, and was released early.

Kessler was expelled from the Party of Democratic Socialism (SED) in 1990. In 2009, he joined the German Communist Party (DKP). He was an unsuccessful DKP candidate in the 2011 Berlin state election. Kessler died on 2 May 2017 at the age of 97.

Notes

1920 births
2017 deaths
People from Lubań
People from the Province of Lower Silesia
Communist Party of Germany politicians
Members of the Politburo of the Central Committee of the Socialist Unity Party of Germany
German Communist Party politicians
Ministers of National Defence (East Germany)
Members of the Provisional Volkskammer
Members of the 1st Volkskammer
Members of the 2nd Volkskammer
Members of the 3rd Volkskammer
Members of the 4th Volkskammer
Members of the 5th Volkskammer
Members of the 6th Volkskammer
Members of the 7th Volkskammer
Members of the 8th Volkskammer
Members of the 9th Volkskammer
Free German Youth members
Union of Persecutees of the Nazi Regime members
Army generals of the National People's Army
German military personnel of World War II
German defectors to the Soviet Union
German expatriates in the Soviet Union
Soviet military personnel of World War II
National Committee for a Free Germany members
Military Academy of the General Staff of the Armed Forces of the Soviet Union alumni
German politicians convicted of crimes
Recipients of the Scharnhorst Order
Recipients of the Patriotic Order of Merit (honor clasp)
Recipients of the Banner of Labor
Commanders of the Order of Merit of the Republic of Poland
20th-century German criminals
Prisoners and detainees of Germany
German people convicted of manslaughter
People sentenced to death in absentia
People condemned by Nazi courts
German prisoners sentenced to death
Deserters